Persatuan Sepakbola Indonesia Sangihe or Persis Sangihe is an Indonesian football club based in Tahuna, Sangihe Islands Regency, North Sulawesi. They currently compete in the Liga 3.

Honours
 Liga 3 North Sulawesi
 Third-place: 2021

References

Sangihe Islands
Football clubs in Indonesia
Football clubs in North Sulawesi
Association football clubs established in 2017
2017 establishments in Indonesia